Black Loyalists were people of African descent who sided with the Loyalists during the American Revolutionary War. In particular, the term refers to men who escaped enslavement by Patriot masters and served on the Loyalist side because of the Crown's guarantee of freedom.

Some 3,000 Black Loyalists were evacuated from New York to Nova Scotia; they were individually listed in the Book of Negroes as the British gave them certificates of freedom and arranged for their transportation. The Crown gave them land grants and supplies to help them resettle in Nova Scotia. Some of the European Loyalists who emigrated to Nova Scotia brought their enslaved servants with them, making for an uneasy society.  One historian has argued that those slaves should not be regarded as Loyalists, as they had no choice in their fates. Other Black Loyalists were evacuated to London or the Caribbean colonies.

Thousands of enslaved people escaped from plantations and fled to British lines, especially after British occupation of Charleston, South Carolina. When the British evacuated, they took many former enslaved people with them. Many ended up among London's Black Poor, with 4,000 resettled by the Sierra Leone Company to Freetown in Africa in 1787.  Five years later, another 1,192 Black Loyalists from Nova Scotia chose to emigrate to Sierra Leone, becoming known as the Nova Scotian Settlers  in the new British colony of Sierra Leone. Both waves of settlers became part of the Sierra Leone Creole people and the founders of the nation of Sierra Leone. Thomas Jefferson referred to the Black Loyalists as "the fugitives from these States".

Background
Slavery in England had never been authorized by legal statutes. Villeinage, a form of semi-serfdom, was legally recognized but long obsolete. In 1772, a slave threatened with being taken out of England and returned to the Caribbean challenged the authority of his master in the case of Somerset v Stewart. Chief Justice Lord Mansfield ruled that slavery had no standing under common law and slave owners, therefore, were not permitted to transport slaves outside England and Wales against their will. Many observers took it to mean that slavery was ended in England.

Lower courts often interpreted the ruling as determining that the status of slavery did not exist in England and Wales, but Mansfield ruled more narrowly. The decision did not apply to the North American and Caribbean colonies, where local legislatures had passed laws to institutionalize slavery. A number of cases were presented to the English courts for the emancipation of slaves residing in England, and numerous American runaways hoped to reach England where they expected to gain freedom.

American slaves began to believe that King George III was for them and against their masters as tensions increased before the American Revolution. Colonial slaveholders feared a British-inspired slave rebellion, and Lord Dunmore wrote to Lord Dartmouth in early 1775 of his intention to take advantage of the situation.

Proclamations

Dunmore's Proclamation 
In November 1775, Lord Dunmore issued a controversial proclamation. As Virginia's royal governor, he called on all able-bodied men to assist him in the defence of the colony, including slaves belonging to the Patriots. He promised such slave recruits freedom in exchange for service in the British Army. 

Within a month, about 800 former slaves had fled to Norfolk, Virginia to enlist. Outraged Virginia slave owners decreed that runaway slaves would be executed, and they also counteracted the promises of Lord Dunmore by claiming that slaves who escaped to Lord Dunmore would be sold to sugar plantations in the Caribbean. But many slaves were willing to risk their lives for a chance at freedom.

Lord Dunmore's Proclamation was the first mass emancipation of slaves in America.  The 1776 Declaration of Independence refers obliquely to the Proclamation by citing it as one of its grievances, that King George III had "excited domestic Insurrections among us". An earlier version of the Declaration was more explicit, stating the following of King George III, but these controversial details were dropped during the final development of the document in Congress.

After the war began, a number of British generals issued proclamations calling for Loyalists to free their slaves so that they could join the undermanned British army and bolster its numbers. Among those issuing proclamations were Lord Dunmore, Governor of Virginia, and Sir Henry Clinton. Jamaica's Governor John Dalling drafted a proposal in 1779 for the enlistment of a regiment of mulattoes and another regiment of free Negroes.

Philipsburg Proclamation 
With the arrival of 30,000 Hessian mercenary troops, the British did not have as much need of former slaves. Sir William Howe banned the formation of new Black regiments and disbanded his own. But freeing slaves of rebels still held value as economic warfare against the American so-called Patriots. In 1779, Sir Henry Clinton issued the Philipsburg Proclamation, expanding Dunmore's Proclamation and promising freedom to any escaped slave of a Patriot. However, Clinton often ordered the returned escaped slaves to Loyalist masters, though he requested the owner to refrain from punishment. In 1778 the Patriots promised freedom to escaped slaves of Loyalists. But as Boston King noted in his memoir, both Patriots and Loyalists who captured escaped slaves often sold them back into slavery.

Evacuation and resettlement
When the British evacuated their troops from Charleston and New York after the war, they made good on their promises and took thousands of freed slaves with them. They resettled the freedmen in colonies in the Caribbean, such as Jamaica, and in Nova Scotia and Upper Canada, as well as transporting some to London. The Canadian climate and other factors made Nova Scotia difficult. In addition, the Poor Blacks of London, many former slaves, had trouble getting work. British abolitionists ultimately founded Freetown in what became Sierra Leone on the coast of West Africa, as a place to resettle Black Loyalists from London and Canada, and Jamaican Maroons. Nearly 2,000 Black Loyalists left Nova Scotia to help found the new colony in Africa. Their descendants are the Sierra Leone Creole people.

Black Loyalist military units

Lord Dunmore's proclamation and others led to the formation of several Black regiments in the British army. The most notable were Dunmore's Ethiopian Regiment and Clinton's Black Company of Pioneers. Other regiments included the Jersey Shore Volunteers, the Jamaica Rangers, the Mosquito Shore Volunteers, and the Black Dragoons of the South Carolina Royalists. It was also common for Black Loyalists to serve the military in non-combat positions, such as the Black Company of Pioneers.

Black Company of Pioneers and Guides and Pioneers
The largest Black Loyalist regiment was the Black Company of Pioneers, better known as the "Black Pioneers" and later merged into the Guides and Pioneers. In the military terminology of the day, a "pioneer" was a soldier who built roads, dug trenches, and did other manual labor. These soldiers were typically divided into smaller corps and attached to larger armies. The Black Pioneers worked to build fortifications and other necessities, and they could be called upon to work under fire. They served under General Clinton in a support capacity in North Carolina, New York, Newport, Rhode Island, and Philadelphia.  They did not sustain any casualties because they were never used in combat. In Philadelphia, their general orders to "attend the scavengers, assist in cleaning the streets & removing all newsiances being thrown into the streets".

Ethiopian Regiment

Lord Dunmore organized his 800 Black Loyalist volunteers into the Ethiopian Regiment. They trained in the rudiments of marching and shooting before engaging in their first conflict at the Battle of Kemp's Landing. The Patriot militia at Kemp's Landing was unprepared for the attack and retreated. Next, Dunmore led the Royal Ethiopians into the Battle of Great Bridge; Dunmore was overconfident and misinformed about the Patriot numbers, however, and the Patriots overwhelmed the British troops. After the battle, Dunmore loaded his Black troops onto ships of the British fleet, hoping to take the opportunity to train them better. The cramped conditions led to the spread of smallpox. By the time that Dunmore retreated to the Province of New York, only 300 of the original 800 soldiers had survived.

Black Brigade
The "Black Brigade" was a small combat unit of 24 in New Jersey led by Colonel Tye, a slave from Monmouth County, New Jersey who had escaped to British lines early in the war. The title of colonel was not an official military designation, as he was not formally commissioned as an officer, but such titles were permitted anyway in an unofficial capacity. Tye and the Black Brigade were the most feared Loyalists in New Jersey, and he led them in several raids from 1778 at the Battle of Monmouth to defending the British in occupied New York in the winter of 1779. Beginning in June 1780, Tye led several actions against Patriots in Monmouth County, and he was wounded in the wrist during a raid on a Patriot militia leader in September. Within weeks, he died from gangrene, and Black Pioneer leader  Stephen Blucke took over the Black Brigade and led it through the end of the war.

Postwar treatment
When peace negotiations began after the siege of Yorktown, a primary issue of debate was the fate of Black British soldiers. Loyalists who remained in the United States wanted Black soldiers returned so their chances of receiving reparations for damaged property would be increased, but British military leaders fully intended to keep the promise of freedom made to Black soldiers despite the anger of the Americans.

In the chaos as the British evacuated Loyalist refugees, particularly from New York and Charleston, many American slave owners attempted to recapture their former slaves. Some would capture any Black, including those born free before the war, and sell them into slavery. The U.S. Congress ordered George Washington to retrieve any American property, including slaves, from the British, as stipulated by the Treaty of Paris of 1783.

Since Sir Guy Carleton intended to honor the promise of freedom, the British proposed a compromise that would compensate slave owners and provide certificates of freedom and the right to be evacuated to one of the British colonies to any Black person who could prove his service or status. The British transported more than 3,000 Black Loyalists to Nova Scotia, the greatest number of people of African descent to arrive there at any one time. One of their settlements, Birchtown, Nova Scotia was the largest free African community in North America for the first few years of its existence.

Black Loyalists found the northern climate and frontier conditions in Nova Scotia difficult and were subject to discrimination by other Loyalist settlers, many of them slaveholders. In July 1784, Black Loyalists in Shelburne were targeted in the Shelburne Riots, the first recorded race riots in Canadian history. Crown officials granted land to the Black Loyalists of lesser quality and that were more rocky and less fertile than that given to White Loyalists. In 1792, the British government offered Black Loyalists the chance to resettle in a new colony in Sierra Leone. The Sierra Leone Company was established to manage its development. Half of the Black Loyalists in Nova Scotia, nearly 1200, departed the country and moved permanently to Sierra Leone. They set up the community of "Freetown".

In 1793, the British transported another 3,000 Blacks to Florida, Nova Scotia and England as free men and women. Their names were recorded in the Book of Negroes by Sir Carleton.

Approximately 300 free Black people in Savannah refused to evacuate at the end of the war, fearing they would be re-enslaved once they arrived in the West Indies. They established an independent colony in swamps near Savannah River, though by 1786 most of them were discovered and returned to slavery, as Southern planters ignored the fact that they had been freed by the British during the war. When the British ceded the colonies of East Florida and West Florida back to Spain per the terms of the Treaty of Paris, hundreds of free Black people which had been transported there from the South were left behind as British forces pulled out of the region.

Descendants
Many descendants of Black loyalists have been able to track their ancestry by using General Carleton's Book of Negroes. The number of these descendants is unknown.

Nova Scotia

Between 1776 and 1785, around 3,500 Blacks were transported to Nova Scotia from the United States, part of a larger migration of about 34,000 Loyalist refugees. This massive influx of people increased the population by almost 60%, and led to the establishment of New Brunswick as its own colony in 1784.  Most of the free Blacks settled at Birchtown, the largest Black township in North America at the time, next to the town of Shelburne, settled by whites.  There are also a number of Black loyalists buried in unmarked graves in the Old Burying Ground (Halifax, Nova Scotia).

Among, the descendants of the Black Loyalists are noted figures such as Rose Fortune, a Black woman living in Nova Scotia who became a police officer and a businesswoman. Measha Brueggergosman (née Gosman), the Canadian opera and concert singer, is a New Brunswick native and descendant of a Black Loyalist through her father. In the closing days of the Revolution, along with British troops and other Black Loyalists, her paternal four-times-great-grandfather and grandmother left the colonies. They were resettled in Shelburne with their first child, who had been born free behind British lines in New York.

Commemoration
The Black Loyalist settlement of Birchtown, Nova Scotia was declared a National Historic Site in 1997. A seasonal museum commemorating the Black Loyalists was opened in that year by the Black Loyalist Heritage Society. A memorial has been established at the Black Loyalist Burying Ground.  Built around the historic Birchtown school and church, the museum was badly damaged by an arson attack in 2008 but rebuilt. The Society began plans for a major expansion of the museum to tell the story of the Black Loyalists in America, Nova Scotia and Sierra Leone.

Sierra Leone

Some Black Loyalists were transported to London, where they struggled to create new lives. Sympathy for the black veterans who had fought for the British stimulated support for the Committee for the Relief of the Black Poor. This organization backed the resettlement of the black poor from London to a new British colony of Sierra Leone in West Africa. In addition, Black Loyalists in Nova Scotia were offered the opportunity to relocate, and about half chose to move to the new colony. Today the descendants of these pioneers are known as the Sierra Leone Creole people, or Krios. They live primarily in the Western Area of Freetown.

Black Loyalists from the American South brought their languages to Freetown, such as Gullah from the Low Country and African American Vernacular English. Their lingua franca was a strong influence on the descendants of this community, who developed Krio as a language. Many of the Sierra Leone Creoles or Krios can trace their ancestry directly to their Black Loyalist ancestors.

An example of such an ancestor is Harry Washington, likely born about 1740 in The Gambia, enslaved as a young man and shipped to Virginia. He was purchased by George Washington in 1763; he escaped about 1776 in Virginia to British lines, eventually making his way to New York. He was among free blacks evacuated to Nova Scotia by the British following the war. He later took the opportunity to migrate to Freetown in Africa. There by 1800 he became the leader of a rebellion against colonial rule and faced a military tribunal. His descendants are part of the Creole population, who make up 5.8% of the total.

Notable Black Loyalists 
 Stephen Blucke, commanding officer of the Black Company of Pioneers
 David George, American Baptist preacher
 Abraham Hazeley, Nova Scotian settler
 Boston King, first Methodist missionary to indigenous Africans
 Moses Wilkinson, American Methodist preacher
 John Kizell, American immigrant to Sierra Leone
 John Marrant, Methodist preacher
 Cato Perkins, American missionary to Sierra Leone
 Thomas Peters, one of the "Founding Fathers" of the nation of Sierra Leone
 Colonel Tye, soldier
 Harry Washington, freedman who resettled in Sierra Leone after enslavement to George Washington

In popular culture
 The saga of the Black Loyalists inspired Lawrence Hill's 2007 novel The Book of Negroes (published as Someone Knows My Name in the United States). It won the 2008 Commonwealth Award for Fiction.
 In the second episode of the 2016 miniseries Roots, protagonist Kunta Kinte is a Black Loyalist and briefly serves in Lord Dunmore's Ethiopian Regiment.

See also
Black refugee (War of 1812)
Black Nova Scotians
History of Nova Scotia
Birchtown, Nova Scotia
Billy (slave)

References

Cassandra Pybus, Epic Journeys of Freedom: Runaway Slaves of the American Revolution and Their Global Quest for Liberty, New York: Beacon, 2006
Simon Schama, Rough Crossings: Britain, the Slaves, and the American Revolution (London: BBC Books, 2005) (New York: Ecco, 2006 )  
 James Holman,  Travels in Madeira, Sierra Leone, Teneriffe, St. Jago, Cape Coast, Fernando Po, Princes island, etc. (Google eBook), 1840

External links 
 Black Loyalist website
 "Biographies of the Loyalist Era: Thomas Peters, Black Loyalist", The Loyalists, Learn Quebec 
 "Loyalties", University of Manitoba, Vol. 17, No. 1
 Heritage: Black Loyalists, Saint John
 Black Loyalist Heritage Society, official website
 Black History, National Archives, United Kingdom
 Africans in America: Revolution, PBS
 Loyalist Institute, Documents and writings on Black Loyalists
 Anti-Slavery movement, Collections Canada
 Enslaved Africans in Upper Canada, Archives
 Nova Scotia archives, virtual exhibition
  Black Loyalists' experience in Canada, Atlantic Canadian Portal

Pre-emancipation African-American history
American rebel slaves
African Americans in the American Revolution
 
Slavery in the United States
History of immigration to Canada
History of Sierra Leone
Ethnic groups in Nova Scotia